Err station (French: Gare d'Err) is a railway station in Err, Pyrénées-Orientales, Occitanie, southern France. Within TER Occitanie, it is part of line 32 (Latour-de-Carol-Enveitg–Villefranche-Vernet-les-Bains, Train Jaune).

In 2018, the SNCF estimated that 306 passengers travelled through the station.

References

Railway stations in Pyrénées-Orientales